Logothetis is a Greek surname derived from the Byzantine title of logothetes. The feminine form is Logotheti (Λογοθέτη). 

 Anestis Logothetis (1921–1994), Greek-Austrian composer
 Dimitri Logothetis, Greek-American actor and director
 George Logothetis (born 1975), Greek-British businessman
 Lykourgos Logothetis (1772–1850), leader of Samos during the Greek War of Independence
 Nikos Logothetis (born 1950), Greek biologist

Greek-language surnames
Surnames